Justin Scott Hartley (born January 29, 1977) is an American actor. He has played Fox Crane on the NBC daytime soap opera Passions (2002–2006), Oliver Queen/Green Arrow on The CW television series Smallville (2006–2011), and Adam Newman on the CBS daytime soap opera The Young and the Restless (2014–2016) which earned him a Daytime Emmy nomination. He also had recurring roles in the third season of the television drama series Revenge (2013–2014) and in the final three seasons of the drama series Mistresses (2014–2016).

Hartley gained wider attention for starring as Kevin Pearson in the NBC drama series This Is Us, from 2016 to 2022, for which he was thrice nominated for the Critics' Choice Television Award for Best Supporting Actor in a Drama Series. He has since starred in the films A Bad Moms Christmas (2017) and The Noel Diary (2022).

Early life
Hartley was born when his family was residing in Knoxville, Illinois, and born at the nearby hospital in Galesburg. He was raised in the Chicago suburb of Orland Park, with his brother Nathan, and sisters Megan and Gabriela. After graduating from Carl Sandburg High School, he attended Southern Illinois University Carbondale and University of Illinois at Chicago where he majored in history and theater.

Career
Justin Hartley portrayed Fox Crane on the NBC daytime soap opera Passions from 2002 to 2006.
In 2006, he played the starring role as Aquaman in a television pilot for The CW titled Aquaman (or Mercy Reef), but it was not picked up as a series. Hartley did a seven-episode run as billionaire Oliver Queen on the CW series Smallville later that year. In 2008, he returned to Smallville as a regular cast member, following the departures of Kristin Kreuk, Michael Rosenbaum, Laura Vandervoort, and John Glover. Hartley also co-wrote the 2010 episode "Sacrifice" and directed the 2011 episode "Dominion". In 2008, he starred as Tom in the film Red Canyon, filmed in the badlands of Utah.

After Smallville, Hartley starred opposite Mamie Gummer in The CW comedy-drama Emily Owens, M.D., but the show was cancelled after one season. He also guest-starred on Chuck, Castle, and Hart of Dixie, and from 2013 to 2014, he had a recurring role as Victoria Grayson's (Madeleine Stowe) illegitimate son, Patrick Osbourne, on the ABC primetime soap opera Revenge. In February 2014, Hartley landed the lead role of Tim opposite Anna Camp in the ABC comedy pilot Damaged Goods, but the show was never picked up to series.
In March 2014, he was cast in a recurring role in the second season of the ABC drama series Mistresses as plastic surgeon Scott Trosman, a love interest for Josslyn Carver (Jes Macallan). In November 2014, Hartley took over the role of Adam Newman on the CBS daytime soap opera The Young and the Restless, and played the role until September 2016.

In 2015, it was announced that Hartley was cast in a series regular role on the NBC drama series This Is Us, which debuted in September 2016. He and the cast won Outstanding Performance by an Ensemble in a Drama Series at the 24th Screen Actors Guild Awards. In 2017, he had a co-starring role in the comedy film A Bad Moms Christmas. In August 2020, Hartley signed on to star and executive produce a film adaptation of The Noel Diary, based on the novel of the same name.

Personal life
In 2003, Hartley began dating his Passions co-star Lindsay Korman (who played Theresa Lopez-Fitzgerald). After six months, the two became engaged on November 13, 2003. They married on May 1, 2004,  in a small ceremony. On July 3, 2004, Korman gave birth to their daughter. On May 6, 2012, after eight years of marriage, it was announced that she had filed for divorce in the Los Angeles County Superior Court, citing "irreconcilable differences". They remain on amicable terms and shared joint custody of their daughter.

In January 2014, actress Chrishell Stause's representation confirmed that Hartley and Stause were dating and in July 2016, they announced their engagement. They were married on October 28, 2017. Hartley and Stause resided in Valley Glen, Los Angeles. In November 2019, Hartley filed for divorce, citing irreconcilable differences. Stause filed for dissolution of the marriage in December 2019. The divorce was finalized on February 22, 2021.

Hartley married The Young and the Restless co-star Sofia Pernas in March 2021.

Filmography

Awards and nominations

References

External links

 
 The Young and the Restless site for Hartley

1977 births
21st-century American male actors
American male film actors
American male soap opera actors
American male television actors
Living people
Male actors from Illinois
Male actors from Los Angeles
People from Knoxville, Illinois
University of Illinois Chicago alumni